Leopold Rufus "Leo" Allen (born July 5, 1972) is an American stand-up comedian and writer from Detroit, Michigan, known as one half of the comedy team Slovin and Allen.

Career 
Allen has been performing stand-up comedy since the late 1990s.  In 2001, Allen, along with his writing partner, Eric Slovin, starred in their own Comedy Central Presents special 
which featured sketches such as "Time Machine" and "Turkey Slapper". Slovin and Allen went on to write for Saturday Night Live from 2002 - 2005.

He appeared in the 1997 comedy film Who's the Caboose? starring Sarah Silverman, which featured the first movie appearances of numerous comedians.

A veteran of numerous New York City comedy clubs and alternative venues, Allen performs solo and as part of the duo "Slovin and Allen." He has toured with comedians such as Eugene Mirman, Demetri Martin, Todd Barry, Michael Showalter, and others.  He currently hosts "Whiplash" at Upright Citizen's Brigade Theatre in NYC, for which he was nominated for a 2009 ECNY Award for Best Host.

Beginning in September 2005, Allen challenged himself to read 100 books in one year.  Halfway into that endeavor, he cited as favorites The Ginger Man by J.P. Donleavy, The Master and Margarita by Mikhail Bulgakov, Don Quixote by Miguel de Cervantes and anything by Octavia Butler.

Allen's writing has appeared in the New York Times Magazine. His television credits include Late Night with Conan O'Brien, Funny or Die Presents, Comedians of Comedy, Human Giant, Michael and Michael Have Issues and more.

Allen co-starred in the comedy series Jon Benjamin Has a Van, which ran on Comedy Central for one season in 2011. He was also the show's co-creator and executive producer.

Allen was a writer and executive producer on the first season of IFC series Comedy Bang! Bang!, which aired in 2012. He guest starred on the third episode which aired on June 22, 2012, playing a man who eats bicycles.

References

External links 
 
 Slovin and Allen
 MySpace Page

1972 births
Living people
American stand-up comedians
American male television actors
People from Massachusetts
American television producers
American television writers
American male television writers
Upright Citizens Brigade Theater performers
21st-century American comedians
21st-century American screenwriters
21st-century American male writers